Coleothrix swinhoeella is a species of snout moth in the genus Coleothrix. It was described by Ragonot in 1888. It is found in Taiwan, Burma, India, Sri Lanka, Borneo, Malaysia,
Sumatra, Bali, Sulawesi, the Philippines and the New Hebrides.

References

Moths described in 1893
Phycitinae